M. R. Krishna (born at Trimulgherry, 1924) was member of 1st Lok Sabha from Karimnagar (Lok Sabha constituency) in Andhra Pradesh State, India. He was re-elected to 2nd Lok Sabha from Karimnagar.

Later he was elected to 3rd and 4th Lok Sabha from Peddapalle (Lok Sabha constituency). He a member of the Scheduled Castes Federation (SCF) (later the Republican Party of India), B. R. Ambedkar's political party.

References

India MPs 1952–1957
India MPs 1957–1962
India MPs 1962–1967
India MPs 1967–1970
Andhra Pradesh politicians
Lok Sabha members from Andhra Pradesh
1924 births
Year of death missing
People from Karimnagar district
Republican Party of India politicians
Scheduled Castes Federation politician